Vozarci is a village in the municipality of Kavadarci, North Macedonia.

Demographics
According to the statistics of Bulgarian ethnographer Vasil Kanchov from 1900, 195 inhabitants lived in Vozarci, all Christian Bulgarians.According to the 2002 census, the village had a total of 910 inhabitants. Ethnic groups in the village include:

Macedonians 904
Serbs 5
Others 1

References

Villages in Kavadarci Municipality